Funastrum utahense, synonym Cynanchum utahense, is a species of flowering plant in the genus Funastrum of the family Apocynaceae, known by the common names Utah swallow-wort and Utah vine milkweed. This relatively uncommon perennial vine is native to the Mojave Desert from California, Nevada, Utah and Arizona in the United States. This is a small vine with a highly branched, twining stem rarely exceeding a meter in length with which it physically supports itself on other shrubs and trees. It has small narrow leaves a few centimeters long. Its flowers are bright yellow to orange and grow in umbels. The fruit is a grooved follicle several centimeters long.

References

External links

Jepson Manual Treatment
USDA Plants Profile
Photo gallery

North American desert flora
Flora of California
Flora of Arizona
Flora of Nevada
Flora of Utah
Plants described in 1875
Flora without expected TNC conservation status